Lucas Carlsson (born 5 July 1997) is a Swedish professional ice hockey defenceman currently playing with the Charlotte Checkers in the American Hockey League (AHL) while under contract to the Florida Panthers of the National Hockey League (NHL). Carlsson was selected 110th overall by the Chicago Blackhawks in the 2016 NHL Entry Draft.

Playing career
Carlsson made his Swedish Hockey League debut playing with Brynäs IF during the 2014–15 SHL season.

After completing his fourth SHL season in 2017–18 and having continued his development with Brynäs, Carlsson was signed to a three-year, entry-level contract with the Chicago Blackhawks on 21 May 2018.

During the pandemic delayed 2020–21 season, after registering 1 assist in 12 appearances with the Blackhawks, Carlsson was traded alongside Lucas Wallmark to the Florida Panthers in exchange for Brett Connolly, Riley Stillman, Henrik Borgström and a 2021 7th round draft pick on 8 April 2021.

Career statistics

Regular season and playoffs

International

References

External links

1997 births
Living people
People from Gävle
Brynäs IF players
Charlotte Checkers (2010–) players
Chicago Blackhawks draft picks
Chicago Blackhawks players
Florida Panthers players
Rockford IceHogs (AHL) players
Swedish ice hockey defencemen
Syracuse Crunch players
Sportspeople from Gävleborg County